Michael Anthony "Tony" Washington II  (born October 18, 1990) is a former American football wide receiver who is currently the wide receivers coach at Liberty. He was originally signed as an undrafted free agent by the Indianapolis Colts in 2014. He played college football at Appalachian State.

Professional career

Indianapolis Colts
On May 11, 2014, Washington was signed by the Colts as an undrafted free agent. On August 25, 2014, he was waived by the team.

Jacksonville Jaguars

2014
On September 1, 2014, Washington was signed to the Jaguars' practice squad where he spent his entire rookie season. On December 29, 2014, he signed a reserve/futures contract with the Jaguars.

2015
On September 4, 2015, Washington was waived by the Jaguars. and was signed to the Jaguars' practice squad. On September 26, 2015, he was promoted to the active roster. He made his NFL debut the next day tallying one special team tackle. The following week, he made his first career rush for eight yards. He saw action on offense and on special teams the next two weeks before suffering a quad injury. On October 20, 2015, he was placed on injured reserve.

2016
On September 1, 2016, Washington was placed on injured reserve. On September 8, 2016, he was released from the Jaguars' injured reserve with an injury settlement. He was re-signed to the practice squad on November 10, 2016. He was promoted to the active roster on December 23, 2016. On May 1, 2017, he was released by the Jaguars.

New England Patriots
Washington was signed by the New England Patriots on July 27, 2017. He was waived by the Patriots on September 2, 2017.

References

External links
Jacksonville Jaguars bio

1990 births
Living people
Sportspeople from High Point, North Carolina
Players of American football from North Carolina
American football wide receivers
Appalachian State Mountaineers football players
Jacksonville Jaguars players
New England Patriots players
Coaches of American football from North Carolina
East Carolina Pirates football coaches
Louisville Cardinals football coaches
Coastal Carolina Chanticleers football coaches